The first season of Tu cara me suena premiered on Univision on October 4, 2020. The series is the American Spanish-language version of the Endemol format Your Face Sounds Familiar. This season features eight celebrities that compete in a song and dance number while impersonating iconic singers. The season is hosted by Ana Brenda Contreras and Rafael Araneda. The judging panel consists of Angélica Vale, Jesús Navarro, Kany García, and Charytín Goyco.

On October 16, 2020, it was announced that production of the season was suspended due to multiple positive COVID-19 cases in its contestants. The season resumed on November 8, 2020. On November 29, 2020, El Dasa was declared the winner of the season.

Judges

Contestants

Performances

Weekly results

Week 1: October 4

Week 2: October 11

Week 3: November 8

Week 4: November 15

Week 5: November 22

Ratings

Notes

References

Your Face Sounds Familiar
2020 American television seasons